The theriodonts (clade Theriodontia) are a major group of therapsids which appeared during the Middle Permian and which includes the gorgonopsians and the eutheriodonts, itself including the therocephalians and the cynodonts.

Naming
In 1876, Richard Owen named a suborder Theriodontia, which he divided into the Cynodontia and the Gomphodontia.

The modern clade concept was devised by James Allen Hopson. In his system, Theriodontia fall into two main groups: the Gorgonopsia and the Eutheriodontia. The latter consist of the Therocephalia and Cynodontia.

Evolution
Theriodonts appeared at the same time as their sister group within the Neotherapsida, the Anomodontia, about 270 million years ago, in the Middle Permian. Even these early theriodonts were more mammal-like than their anomodont and dinocephalian contemporaries.

Early theriodonts may have been warm-blooded. Early forms were carnivorous, but several later groups became herbivorous during the Triassic. Theriodont jaws were more mammal-like than was the case of other therapsids, because their dentary was larger, which gave them more efficient chewing ability. Furthermore, several other bones that were on the lower jaw (found in reptiles), moved into the ears, allowing the theriodonts to hear better and their mouths to open wider. This made the theriodonts the most successful group of synapsids.

Eutheriodontia
Eutheriodontia refers to all theriodonts except the gorgonopsians (the most "primitive" group). They included the therocephalians and the cynodonts. The cynodonts include the mammals. The eutheriodonts have larger skulls, accommodating larger brains and improved jaw muscles.

The eutheriodontian theriodonts are one of the two synapsid survivors of the great Permian–Triassic extinction event, the other being the dicynodonts. Therocephalians included both carnivorous and herbivorous forms; both died out after the Early Triassic. The remaining theriodonts, the cynodonts, also included carnivores, such as Cynognathus, as well as newly evolved herbivores (Traversodontidae). While traversodontids for the most part remained medium-sized to reasonably large (the length of the largest species was up to two meters), the carnivorous forms became progressively smaller as the Triassic progressed. They "miniaturised". By the Late Triassic, the small cynodonts included the rodent-like Tritylodontidae (possibly related to or descended from traversodontids), and the tiny, shrew-like, Trithelodontidae, related to the Mammaliaformes. The trithelodontids died out during the Jurassic, and the tritylodontids survived into the Cretaceous, but their relatives, the mammals, continued to evolve. Many mammal groups managed to survive the Cretaceous–Paleogene extinction event, which wiped out the non-avian dinosaurs, allowing the mammals to diversify and dominate the Earth.

Taxonomy

Classification
 Order Therapsida
 Theriodont *
 Suborder †Gorgonopsia
 Family †Gorgonopsidae
 Eutheriodontia
 Suborder †Therocephalia
 Family †Lycosuchidae
 (unranked) †Scylacosauria
 Family †Scylacosauridae
 Infraorder †Eutherocephalia
 Family †Hofmeyriidae
 Family †Moschorhinidae
 Family †Whaitsiidae
 Superfamily †Baurioidea
 Family †Bauriidae
 Family †Ericiolacteridae
 Family †Ictidosuchidae
 Genus †Ictidosuchoides
 Genus †Ictidosuchus
 Family †Ictidosuchopsidae
 Family †Lycideopidae
 Suborder Cynodontia

Phylogenetics of Theriodontia
Therapsida
†Biarmosuchia
†Eotitanosuchia
†Dinocephalia
†Anomodontia
Theriodontia
†Gorgonopsia
†Therocephalia
Cynodontia
†Dviniidae
Mammalia
†Procynosuchidae
†Galesauridae
†Thrinaxodontidae
†Cynognathidae
†Gomphodontia
†Chiniquodontidae
†Probainognathidae
†Tritheledontidae (Ictidosauria)

See also 
 Evolution of mammals
 Anomodonts
 Timeline of evolution

Notes

References

External links 
 Theriodontia - at Paleos

Therapsids
Guadalupian first appearances
Taxa named by Richard Owen